WFMH (1340 AM) is a radio station licensed to serve Cullman, Alabama, United States.  The station is owned by Jimmy Dale Media. It airs a sports format.

The station was assigned the WFMH call letters by the Federal Communications Commission on September 20, 2002.

Ownership
The station first signed on the air as WKUL on October 1, 1946, under the ownership of the Cullman Broadcasting Company.

During the 1980s the station was owned and operated by Piney Hills Broadcasting.  In the mid-1990s the station was acquired by Good Earth Broadcasting which then added a WXXR-FM FM simulcast on 95.5 FM in 1996.

In 1998 101.1 FM in Cullman (WFMH-FM) was leased to a group in Birmingham who wanted to broadcast contemporary Christian music (Reality 101) so the 101.1 FM. The station was leased and later sold and funds from the transaction were used to purchase WXXR-AM-FM from Good Earth Broadcasting.

In May 2004, Voice of Cullman LLC (Clark P. Jones, member/manager) agreed to transfer the license for WFMH and then-sister station WFMH-FM to Williams Communications (Walton E. Williams Jr., president/director). The two stations sold for a reported total of $2.45 million.

In May 2008, a deal was reached to transfer control of this station from Williams Communications, Inc. to Walton E. Williams III. The FCC approved the deal on July 1, 2008, and the transaction was consummated on the same day.

In August 2008, Walton E. Williams III reached an agreement to sell WFMH and sister station WMCJ to Jimmy Dale Media LLC. The two stations sold for a reported total of $375,000. The deal was approved by the FCC on October 6, 2008.

References

External links

FMH
Sports radio stations in the United States
Radio stations established in 1946
1946 establishments in Alabama